Bratsberg Power Station  (Bratsberg kraftverk) is a hydroelectric power station located in Trondheim in Sør-Trøndelag County, Norway, owned by Statkraft. The power plant is fed from the Selbusjøen reservoir, connected with a 12 km long tunnel, offering a gross head of 147 m. The power plant has two Francis turbines.

See also

References 

Hydroelectric power stations in Norway
Buildings and structures in Trondheim